Ophiopholis is a genus of brittle stars (Ophiuroidea) found in oceans worldwide from tropics to temperate regions.

Species
The following species are recognised by the World Register of Marine Species :
Ophiopholis aculeata (Linnaeus, 1767)
Ophiopholis bakeri McClendon, 1909
Ophiopholis brachyactis H.L. Clark, 1911
Ophiopholis japonica Lyman, 1879
Ophiopholis kennerlyi Lyman, 1860
Ophiopholis longispina H.L. Clark, 1911
Ophiopholis mirabilis (Duncan, 1879)
Ophiopholis pilosa Djakonov, 1954

References

Ophiactidae
Ophiuroidea genera